The Central Hunter Valley eucalypt forest and woodland is a grassy woodland community situated in the Hunter Valley, New South Wales, Australia. It was listed in
May 2015 as critically endangered under Australia's national environment law. The Warkworth Sands Woodland of the Hunter Valley, situated in the area, was gazetted as an endangered ecological community in New South Wales on 13 December 2002 under the  NSW Threatened Species Conservation Act 1995 and now under the Biodiversity Act of 2016.

Geography
It is found on low hillslopes and low ridges, or valley floors in undulating land, on soils traced from finer grained sedimentary rocks. The Warkworth Sands Woodland occurs on aeolian sand deposits south of Singleton in the Hunter Valley. These sand dunes are thought to date from the Pleistocene, are from 1–6 m high and rest on a river terrace.  Under the Commonwealth EPBC Act it is listed as Warkworth Sands Woodland of the Hunter Valley.

Warkworth Sands Woodland is found in a small area near Warkworth, with only 800 hectares remaining (thought to be perhaps 13% of its pre-settlement extent). The entire known endangered  community lies outside conservation reserves. Extending from Newcastle in the southeast to Murrurundi to the northwest, traversing large towns such as Singleton and Muswellbrook, the community features mid to low woodland that is generally dominated by Angophora floribunda in its canopy and Banksia integrifolia subsp. integrifolia or Acacia filicifolia in the sub-canopy.

Ecology 
It is dominated by Eucalyptus crebra, Corymbia maculata, Eucalyptus dawsonii, Angophora floribunda, Eucalyptus blakelyi, Eucalyptus glaucina, Eucalyptus tereticornis and Eucalyptus moluccana. Other tree species include Brachychiton populneus, Callitris endlicheri, Acacia salicina, Eucalyptus albens and Eucalyptus punctata. Animals include Litoria aurea, Petrogale penicillata, Pteropus poliocephalus, Pseudomys novaehollandiae, Dasyurus maculatus, Chalinolobus dwyeri, Nyctophilus corbeni, and Grantiella picta.

Threatened fauna which have been recorded in Warkworth Sands Woodland are: Petaurus norfolcensis, (Squirrel Glider), Chthonicola saggitata (Speckled Warbler), Climacteris picumnus victoriae (Brown treecreeper) and Pomatostomus temporalis temporalis (Grey-crowned Babbler).

NSW cases involving Warkworth Sands Woodland
Bulga Milbrodale Progress Association Inc v Minister for Planning and Infrastructure and Warkworth Mining Limited [2013] NSWLEC 48 Bulga Milbrodale Progress association won its appeal against a ministerially approved extension of the open-cut Warkworth Mine.
Warkworth Mining Limited v Bulga Milbrodale Progress Association Inc [2014] NSWCA 105. This case appealed the previous decision of the Land and Environment court which disallowed an extension of the open-cut mine. The appeal was dismissed.

Gallery

References

Endangered Ecological Community
Grasslands of Australia
Remnant urban bushland
Vegetation of Australia
Temperate grasslands, savannas, and shrublands
Environment of New South Wales
Ecoregions of New South Wales
Sclerophyll forests